"Planeta Água" is a song written and performed by Guilherme Arantes, a music artist from São Paulo, Brazil, and released in 1982. It was one of the finalists of the Festival MPB Shell 1981, taking second place. It reached the top 10 of Brazilian parades, and it is one of the most remembered songs by the public; the song speaks about the cycles of Earth's oceans and rivers, highlighting the water's healing and destructive powers both.

Polemic 
Planeta Água was the public's favorite song at the MPB Shell Festival, and expected to take first place, yet the song Purpurina, sung by Lucinha Lins was announced as the winner instead, with Planeta Água coming in second. Lucinha Lins was booed for several minutes by the entire stadium while she reprised the winning song. Some sources admit that the Shell Oil Company, which sponsored the festival, influenced the results. Guilherme himself has talked about this theory.

References

See also 
 Música popular brasileira

Brazilian songs
1982 songs